Monroe County is a county in northeast Missouri. As of the 2020 census, the population was 8,666. Its county seat is Paris. It is the birthplace of Mark Twain.

History
The county was organized January 6, 1831 and named for James Monroe, the fifth President of the United States.

Monroe County was one of several along the Missouri River settled by migrants from the Upper South, especially Kentucky and Tennessee. They brought slaves and slaveholding traditions with them and quickly started cultivating crops similar to those in Middle Tennessee and Kentucky: hemp and tobacco. They also brought characteristic antebellum architecture and culture. The county was at the heart of what was called Little Dixie.

Geography

Adjacent counties
Shelby County (north)
Marion County (northeast)
Ralls County (east)
Audrain County (south)
Randolph County (west)

Major highways
 U.S. Route 24
 U.S. Route 36
 Route 15
 Route 107
 Route 151

Demographics

As of the census of 2010, there were 8,840 people, 3,656 households, and 2,566 families residing in the county. The racial makeup of the county was 94.66% White, 3.83% Black or African American, 0.41% Native American, 0.12% Asian, 0.03% Pacific Islander, 0.16% from other races, and 0.78% from two or more races. Approximately 0.56% of the population were Hispanic or Latino of any race. 24.7% were of German, 23.2% American, 14.2% English and 11.8% Irish ancestry.

There were 3,656 households, out of which 31.60% had children under the age of 18 living with them, 59.10% were married couples living together, 7.70% had a female householder with no husband present, and 29.80% were non-families. 26.50% of all households were made up of individuals, and 12.90% had someone living alone who was 65 years of age or older. The average household size was 2.50 and the average family size was 3.02.

In the county, the population was spread out, with 25.90% under the age of 18, 7.30% from 18 to 24, 25.00% from 25 to 44, 24.20% from 45 to 64, and 17.60% who were 65 years of age or older. The median age was 39 years. For every 100 females there were 96.40 males. For every 100 females age 18 and over, there were 93.10 males.

The median income for a household in the county was $30,871, and the median income for a family was $36,895. Males had a median income of $26,534 versus $20,440 for females. The per capita income for the county was $14,695. About 8.30% of families and 11.90% of the population were below the poverty line, including 14.00% of those under age 18 and 10.30% of those age 65 or over.

2020 Census

Government and politics

Local
The Democratic Party used to dominate politics at the local, state and federal levels in Monroe County. However, like the rest of the state, the county has swung heavily towards the Republican Party in recent years, with Republicans now controlling 10 of the 13 elected positions in the county.

The GOP began to make gains in the county in 2006 at the state and federal level, and has gained ground in almost every election since.

Monroe County voters have selected Republican candidates over Democrats in 13 consecutive U.S. House elections (1998 through 2022), the last nine U.S. Senate elections (2000 through 2022), six continuous presidential contests (2000 through 2020), four of five gubernatorial elections (2004 through 2020), five of six state Senate races, and the last four state auditor races (2010 through 2022). In 2014, for the first time in history, Republican Jim Hansen defeated a Democrat to represent the county in the state House of Representatives. In 2016, for the first time in history, Ron Staggs, a Republican, was elected to a county office when he defeated a Democratic opponent for western commissioner. In 2018 two Republicans were elected to county offices: Talley Kendrick, the first Republican to run unopposed in a general election won as prosecuting attorney, and Lori Decker won a contested election for recorder. In the 2020 general election, four Republicans were elected to county office. In 2022, Curt Wheeler beat a Democrat and an Independent, to become the county's first Republican presiding commissioner.

In the 2008 general election, notwithstanding the secretary of state's race, for the first time in history, Monroe Countians gave a plurality to every Republican candidate for federal and state offices, on the ballot, that had a Democratic opponent. Four years later, in the 2012 election, Republican candidates won six of eight state-wide state and federal races, and one was lost by five votes out of more than 4,000 cast. In November 2016, 2018, 2020, 2022 every Republican for federal and state office, on the county ballot, defeated their Democratic opponent.

In the April 2016 presidential primary, Republicans outvoted Democrats more than 3-to-1, 1,600 votes in the GOP primary compared to 495 in the Democratic, and more Republican votes than Democratic were cast in the 2020 presidential primary.  In 2016's August primary, Republicans out voted Democrats 895 to 698; in the 2018 August primary, Republicans out voted Democrats 1,621 votes to 851. In both the 2020 presidential primary and the August primary Republicans outvoted Democrats two-to-one.

State

Monroe County is divided into two representative districts in the Missouri House of Representatives, both represented by Republicans.

District 5 — Lindell F. Shumake (R-Hannibal). Consists of Monroe City and the northern part of the county.

District 40 – Jim Hansen (R-Frankford). Consists of the communities of Florida, Holliday, Madison, Paris, Santa Fe, and Stoutsville.

Monroe County is a part of Missouri's 10th District in the Missouri Senate and is currently represented by Jeanie Riddle (R-Fulton).

Federal

Monroe County is included in Missouri's 6th congressional district and is currently represented by Sam Graves (R-Tarkio) in the U.S. House of Representatives.

Political culture
During the 19th century and most of the 20th century Democrats controlled Monroe County. The county was one of only two jurisdictions in Missouri to be carried by Democrat George McGovern in the 1972 presidential election against incumbent Republican President Richard Nixon, the other being the city of St. Louis. Monroe County was first carried by a Republican in 1976 by John Danforth in the U.S. Senate race. In 1984, Ronald Reagan became the first Republican candidate for president to win the county. Since 2000, the county has voted Republican in federal and state elections, and now Republicans control two-thirds of elected county positions.

Missouri presidential preference primary (2008)

Missouri presidential preference primary (2016)
In the April 2016 presidential primary, Republicans out voted Democrats more than 3-to-1, 1,600 votes in the GOP primary compared to 495 in the Democrat. In 2016's August primary, Republicans outvoted Democrats 895 to 698.

Education

Public schools
Holliday C-2 School District – Holliday
Holliday Elementary School (K-08)
Madison C-3 School District – Madison
Madison Elementary School (PK-06)
Madison High School (07-12)
Middle Grove C-1 School District – Madison
Middle Grove Elementary School (K-08)
Monroe City R-I School District – Monroe City
Monroe City Elementary School (PK-04)
Monroe City Middle School (05-08)
Monroe City High School (09-12)
Paris R-II School District – Paris
Paris Elementary School (PK-06)
Paris Junior High School (07-08)
Paris High School (09-12)

Private schools
Holy Rosary School – Monroe City (K-09) – Roman Catholic
Foundation for Life Christian School – Paris (PK-12) – Nondenominational Christian

Public libraries
Monroe City Public Library

Communities

Cities and Towns

Florida
Holliday
Madison
Monroe City (partly in Marion County and a small part in Ralls County)
Paris (county seat)
 Stoutsville

Unincorporated Communities

 Ash
 Clapper
 Evansville
 Granville
 Indian Creek
 Middle Grove
 North Fork
 Santa Fe
 Strother
 Tulip
 Woodlawn

Notable people
 Mark Twain, American author and humorist, was born in Monroe County. The Mark Twain Birthplace State Historic Site in Mark Twain State Park commemorates this occasion.
 Xenophon Overton Pindall, member of the Arkansas House of Representatives, Arkansas State Senate and Acting Governor of the U.S. state of Arkansas
 Eli C. D. Shortridge, third Governor of North Dakota from 1893 to 1895' raised in Monroe County.

See also
National Register of Historic Places listings in Monroe County, Missouri

References

External links
 Digitized 1930 Plat Book of Monroe County  from University of Missouri Division of Special Collections, Archives, and Rare Books
 Monroe County Sheriff's Office

 
1831 establishments in Missouri
Populated places established in 1831
Little Dixie (Missouri)